The Baldenweger Buck is a mountain top, in the Black Forest around 900 metres northeast of the Feldberg summit.

The bare ridge drops steeply towards the west, north and east into the surrounding valleys of the Zastlerbach and Seebach. Only towards the south does it transition into a shallow saddle (1,452.8 m) that links the Baldenweger Buck with the Feldberg top.

With its low isolation of 520 metres and a prominence of only 7.7 metres to the Feldberg, the Baldenweger Buck is not considered to be an independent eminence, but a subpeak of the Feldberg. As a result, the second highest summit in the Black Forest is usually seen as the lower, but more prominent, Seebuck.

A waymarked footpath runs over the Baldenweger Buck from the Rinken via the Baldenweger Hut to the summit of the Feldberg.

References

External links 
 1:25,000 topographic map at 

One-thousanders of Germany
Mountains and hills of the Black Forest